Rainbow Arch Bridge may refer to:

 Rainbow Arch Bridge (Valley City, North Dakota), a Marsh Rainbow Arch structure that was built in 1925
 Rainbow Arch Bridge (Fort Morgan, Colorado), a National Register of Historic Places listing in Morgan County, Colorado

See also 
 Rainbow Bridge (disambiguation)